Blood magic may refer to:
Blood ritual
Blood Magic, an episode of  the supernatural drama TV series Grimm
 Blood Magic, the name of the original release of the computer game Dawn of Magic
 Blood Magic, a novel of the World of the Lupi series by  Eileen Wilks
 Blood Magic, a 2001 horror story collection by Lucy A. Snyder
 Blood Magic, a mod for the video game Minecraft that allows players to perform rituals using blood and the souls of demons.

See also

Blood & Magic